The Digman–Zidell House is a house located in southwest Portland, Oregon, listed on the National Register of Historic Places.

The house's second owner was Samuel J. Zidell, a Polish immigrant who founded Zidell Machinery and Supply Company in Portland in 1916. Zidell acquired the property from Anton E. Digman, its original owner, in 1941.

Well known Portland/San Francisco Interior Designer Dawn McKenna (ASID) acquired the property in 1965 and owned it until the mid-1980s.

See also
 National Register of Historic Places listings in Southwest Portland, Oregon

References

Further reading

Houses on the National Register of Historic Places in Portland, Oregon
Houses completed in 1930
Spanish Revival architecture in the United States
1930 establishments in Oregon
Carl L. Linde buildings
Southwest Portland, Oregon
Portland Historic Landmarks